Jeremy "Jem" Godfrey (born 6 October 1971) is a British music producer, keyboardist and songwriter.

In the early 1990s he was a producer at BBC Radio 1, working with many talented producers, before going back to Virgin Radio (where he had had his initial break) to head up the production department. He subsequently worked at Capital Radio before ultimately ending up at Wise Buddhah.

Godfrey was responsible, with Bill Padley at Wisebuddah music, for many UK number one hits including Atomic Kitten's platinum-selling single, "Whole Again", which earned the pair two Ivor Novello Award nominations (shared with the other writers including Andy McCluskey and Stuart Kershaw of Orchestral Manoeuvres in the Dark), and the production and remixing of the international hit version of "Kiss Kiss" by Holly Valance.

He won an Ivor Novello on 25 May 2006 for the best selling single of 2005, "That's My Goal", for The X-Factor's Shayne Ward.

"That's My Goal", was released in the UK on Wednesday, 21 December 2005 and after selling 742,000 copies in the first week (including 313,000 on its first day), it became the Christmas number one single of 2005, held the top spot for four weeks and stayed in the top 75 until June 2006, which was a 21-week run. It therefore became (at that time) the fourth fastest selling UK single of all time, beaten by Elton John's "Candle in the Wind", Will Young's "Anything Is Possible/Evergreen", and Gareth Gates' "Unchained Melody" which sold 685,000, 403,000 and 335,000 copies in their first days of sale respectively). To date, "That's My Goal" has sold 1,080,000 copies.

In 2004, Godfrey formed the progressive rock group Frost* who to date have released four studio albums and a live album.

In the autumn of 2010, Godfrey was contacted by ex-Frank Zappa guitarist Mike Keneally and asked to play keys for Joe Satriani on tour. Godfrey toured for a week with the band before playing the Glasgow and Birmingham shows in the UK while Keneally went to Europe to play piano at Vai-Fest with Steve Vai. In the summer of 2012, Godfrey toured again with Satriani as well as Steve Vai, playing keys for the entire European leg of their G3 Tour.

In July 2012, Radio 2 introduced new jingles created by Godfrey, who appeared briefly on the Chris Evans breakfast show to talk about them.

In 2013, Godfrey mixed and co-produced the second album by LOSERS, signed to Gung Ho! Recordings and featuring XFM's Eddy Temple-Morris and Tom Bellamy from The Cooper Temple Clause. The single "Turn Around" was used as the backing music for the trailer for the fourth season of US television series Game of Thrones, while their single "Azan" was used on the trailer for film Hercules.

In February 2015, Godfrey mixed and co-produced 4 songs with Gary Barlow for the soundtrack album of the Broadway Musical "Finding Neverland" for Zendaya, Jennifer Lopez and Trey Songz, Nick Jonas and Kiesza. Later that year Godfrey again worked with Barlow on 4 songs for the album "Fly" (inspired by the new Eddie The Eagle film) for Holly Johnson, Taron Egerton, Hugh Jackman, Paul Young, and Tony Hadley.

Discography

Single composer 
 Bye Bye Boy – Jennifer Ellison
 Girl's Mind – Play
 I Must Not Chase the Boys – Play
 (Some words in the song) Tide Is High (Get the Feeling) – Atomic Kitten
 Whole Again – Atomic Kitten
 That's My Goal – Shayne Ward
 "What's Your Name" – Morcheeba

Other compositions
 Best in Me – Blue
 If It Takes All Night – Blue
 Love R.I.P. – Blue
 Body to Body – Britannia High
 Confessions – Britannia High
 Number 1 – Cherie
 Absolutely – Gareth Gates
 Whole Again – Play
 Miracle in Me – Rik Waller
 Joy and Pain – Ronan Keating
 Where Does It End Now? – Samantha Mumba
 Body to Body – XYP
 Confessions – XYP

Producer 
 Blue – All Rise (2002, Programming, Instrumentation)
 Ronan Keating – Destination (2002, Arranger, Producer, Instrumentation)
 Atomic Kitten – Feels So Good (2002, Arranger, Programming, Producer, Instrumentation)
 Holly Valance – Footprints (2002, Arranger, Programming, Multi Instruments, Producer, Mixing)
 Lulu – Together (2002, Arranger, Programming, Producer, Instrumentation)
 Play – Don't Stop the Music (2004, Producer, Instrumentation)
 Gareth Gates – Go Your Own Way (2004, Producer, Mixing, Instrumentation)
 Cherie – No. 1, Pt. 2 (2004, Producer, Instrumentation)
 Jennifer Ellison – Bye Bye Boy (2004, Producer, Mixing, Musician)
 Frost* – Experiments in Mass Appeal (2008, Keyboards, Vocals, Moose Whispering, Producer)
 Frost* – The Philadelphia Experiment (2009, Keyboards, Vocals)
 Losers – And So We Shall Never Part (2013, Keyboards, Vocals, Production)

References

English songwriters
Rock songwriters
English record producers
English rock keyboardists
Ivor Novello Award winners
1971 births
Living people
Place of birth missing (living people)
Frost* members